Carlos "Caloy" Matute Loyzaga (August 29, 1930 – January 27, 2016) was a Filipino basketball player and coach. He was the most dominant basketball player of his era in the Philippines and is considered as the greatest Filipino basketball player of all time. Loyzaga was a two-time Olympian (1952, 1956), as a member of the Philippine national team.

Early life
Loyzaga was born in San Jose, Mindoro (now Occidental Mindoro) on August 29, 1930. He was the fourth child of Joaquín Loyzaga Sr. and Carmen Matute. His father was a football player and a member of the Philippine national team which competed and won medals at the Far Eastern Championship Games. Loyzaga survived the Second World War together with his mother, sister, and two brothers. He studied at the Padre Burgos Elementary School in Santa Mesa, Manila and National University for high school until 1948.

Basketball career
Loyzaga learned to play basketball in the neighborhood TERVALAC (Teresa Valenzuela Athletic Club) basketball courts in Teresa Street, Santa Mesa, Manila. It was in the very same TERVALAC court where he was discovered by Gabby Fajardo, one of the Philippines' leading coaches of the time. Fajardo saw promise in Loyzaga and offered to train Loyzaga for his junior PRATRA (Philippine Relief and Trade Rehabilitation Administration) team. In 1949, Loyzaga quit high school to play for PRATRA, winning the MICAA junior crown that year.

San Beda Red Lions
Loyzaga wanted to enroll at Letran, but backed out at the last minute when the coach gave him a cold shoulder.  He was about to enroll at the University of Santo Tomas, but this also did not materialize after Fely Fajardo (older brother of Gabby), coach of the San Beda Red Lions, recruited him. In the NCAA cage wars for the coveted Zamora Trophy in the 1950s, San Beda lost its title bid when Loyzaga did not see action due to scholastic reasons.

During the spirited rivalry between the San Beda Red Lions and the Ateneo Blue Eagles, the sports moderator of San Beda discovered that, under the NCAA (National Collegiate Athletic Association) rules, Loyzaga had one year of eligibility left.  He was allowed to play for that one year specifically for the Red Lions to capture the Zamora Cup, the prize for the team that had three NCAA championships.  The only eligible teams were San Beda (Champions, 1951 and 1952) and Ateneo de Manila (Champions 1953, 1954). Loyzaga successfully helped San Beda clinch the Zamora Trophy. Following San Beda's triple championships (1951, 1952 and 1955), the Zamora Trophy was retired. That moment in time earned Loyzaga the legendary title of "The Big Difference".

YCO Painters
Loyzaga joined the fabled YCO Painters in 1954 after powering PRATRA, and its successor team, PRISCO (Price Stabilization Corporation), to the National Open championship in 1950 and 1953, respectively. He helped the Painters achieve a 49-game winning streak from 1954 to 1956, including several MICAA titles and ten straight National Open titles. Loyzaga took over as the Painters' head coach after retiring in 1964.

Philippine men's basketball team
Loyzaga was a two-time Olympian - 1952 (9th place) and 1956 (7th place) - as a member of the Philippines men's national basketball team. He helped the Philippines become one of the best in the world at the time, winning four consecutive Asian Games gold medals (1951, 1954, 1958, 1962) and two consecutive FIBA Asia Championships (1960, 1963). His finest moment was at the 1954 FIBA World Championship where he led the Philippines to a bronze finish. It was the best finish by an Asian country and the Philippines have remained the only Asian medalist in the tournament. He finished as one of the tournament’s leading scorers with a 16.4 points-per-game average and was named in the tournament's All-Star selection.

Coaching career
Loyzaga started as player-coach for YCO during the early 1960s.  After retiring as a player in 1964, he became the head coach of YCO and the Manila Bank Golden Bankers in the MICAA; and the UST Glowing Goldies in the UAAP. He coached the Philippine men's basketball team that won the 1967 ABC Championship (now known as the FIBA Asia Championship). In the Philippine Basketball Association, he coached U/Tex (1975-1976) and Tanduay (1977-1979).

Personal life
Loyzaga was married to Vicky Cuerva on 21 May 1957; the couple's children include basketball players Chito and Joey, Princess, and actresses Bing and Teresa. He was the grandfather of Diego Loyzaga.

Loyzaga died on January 27, 2016, at the Cardinal Santos Medical Center in San Juan, Metro Manila. He suffered a stroke in Australia in 2011 prior to returning to the Philippines in 2013.

As a posthumous commemoration, the San Beda College officially retired the #14 jersey used by Loyzaga during the opening ceremonies of the NCAA Season 92 basketball tournament on June 25, 2016, at the Mall of Asia Arena. Members of the Loyzaga family attended the jersey retirement ceremony.

Achievements

As player:

NCAA
1951 NCAA Basketball Champions (San Beda College)
1952 NCAA Basketball Champions (San Beda College)
1955 NCAA Basketball Champions/Zamora Cup (Retirement Red Lions San Beda College)

MICAA
 1954 National Basketball Champions (YCO Painters)
 1955 National Basketball Champions (YCO Painters)
 1956 National Basketball Champions (YCO Painters)
 1957 National Basketball Champions (YCO Painters)
 1958 National Basketball Champions (YCO Painters)
 1959 National Basketball Champions (YCO Painters)
 1960 National Basketball Champions (YCO Painters)
 1964 MICAA Champions (YCO Painters)

Philippine national team
 1951 Asian Games champions
 1952 Olympic Games, ninth place
 1954 Asian Games champions
 1954 FIBA World Championship bronze medalist
 FIBA World Championship All-Star Mythical Five (1954)
 1956 Olympic Games, seventh place
 1958 Asian Games champions
 1959 FIBA World Championship, eighth place
 1960 FIBA Asia Championship champions
 FIBA Asia Championship All-Star Mythical Five (1960)
 1962 Asian Games champions
 1963 FIBA Asia Championship champions

As head coach:
 1967 FIBA Asia champions
 1968 Olympic Games, 13th place

Honors
 Philippine National Basketball Hall of Fame (1999)
 Philippine Sportswriters Association Athletes of the 20th Century award (2000)
 Philippine Olympic Committee Presidential Olympism Award (2016)

Publications
Bocobo, Christian and Celis, Beth, Legends and Heroes of Philippine Basketball, (Philippines, 2004)
Dela Cruz, Juan, Book of Pinoy Facts and Records, (National Bookstore, Mandaluyong, Philippines, 2004)

References

External links
 
 Basketball-reference.com
 Blogs.inquirer.net
 Interaksyon.com
 Sports.enquirer.com
 Philstar.com
 Journal.com.ph
 Gameface.ph

1930 births
2016 deaths
Asian Games medalists in basketball
Basketball players at the 1951 Asian Games
Basketball players at the 1952 Summer Olympics
Basketball players at the 1954 Asian Games
Basketball players at the 1956 Summer Olympics
Basketball players at the 1958 Asian Games
Basketball players at the 1962 Asian Games
Filipino men's basketball coaches
Filipino people of Basque descent
Filipino people of Spanish descent
San Beda Red Lions basketball players
Olympic basketball players of the Philippines
People from Occidental Mindoro
U/Tex Wranglers coaches
Philippines men's national basketball team players
Filipino men's basketball players
Philippines men's national basketball team coaches
Basketball players from Manila
Asian Games gold medalists for the Philippines
Medalists at the 1951 Asian Games
Medalists at the 1954 Asian Games
Medalists at the 1958 Asian Games
Medalists at the 1962 Asian Games
Centers (basketball)
Philippine Sports Hall of Fame inductees
1959 FIBA World Championship players
1954 FIBA World Championship players
Tanduay Rhum Masters coaches